Prorivulus auriferus is a genus of fish in the family Rivulidae. It is only known from a small freshwater creek near the coast in the Valença, Bahia region in Brazil. This species is the only known member of its genus. Males are overall yellowish, while the smaller females are duller in color.

References

Rivulidae
Monotypic fish genera
Fish of Brazil
Fish described in 2004